The Ministry of Foreign Affairs and External Trade is the Bhutanese government ministry which oversees the foreign relations of Bhutan. The Royal Government of Bhutan established the Development Ministry in 1968, which was a precursor to the institution of the Department of Foreign Affairs in 1970 and subsequent up gradation to a full-fledged ministry in 1972.

Bhutan has established diplomatic relations with 52 countries and the European Union.

Departments 

The Ministry of Foreign Affairs is responsible for:
Department of Bilateral Affairs  
Department of Multilateral Affairs  
Department of Protocol

List of ministers 
This is a list of Ministers of Foreign Affairs of Bhutan:

See also 
 Foreign relations of Bhutan
 List of diplomatic missions of Bhutan
 List of diplomatic missions in Bhutan

References

External links 
 Ministry of Foreign Affairs

Foreign affairs
Foreign relations of Bhutan
Bhutan